Baan Dam Museum, also known to foreigners as the Black House Museum, is a mixture of traditional northern Thai buildings with unconventional and contemporary architecture, created by Thawan Duchanee.

History 
Thawan Duchanee, the artist who designed and created the Baan Dam Museum, made a contribution to society by beginning to develop educational spaces. He wants to make this a national arts and cultural learning center. Since 1975, Baan Dam Museum has been constantly created for more than 40 years. Many art institutes in Thailand and overseas have offered scholarships to researchers who have lived near Baan Dam for the past 25 years.

Buildings 
The museum covers an area of about 160,000 square meters, consisting of over 40 different structures scattered around the site. Each building has its own unique name and the.

Cathedral (Art Museum Building) 

The Cathedral (Art Museum Building; Thai: มหาวิหาร), was built in 1999 - 2009 designed by Thawan Duchanee and built by Baan Dam's engineers. The Cathedral took 7 years to build and opened after that.
The inspiration of the cathedral is the combination of wood cultures such as form, shape, philosophy etc. with contemporary creativity, Buddhist art and modern architecture.
The cathedral is a rectangular building along the east–west axis. The cathedral has 44 big wooden pillars and has stairs on both sides on the east and west.
The purpose of the cathedral is to do activities such as drawing and recall the doctrine of Buddhism.

Architectural style 
The cathedral is a large single-story building raised from the ground around 2.80 meters on brick. The building structure it's all wooden with a wooden pillar and each base of the wooden pillar has Thai style decor named Bua pattern. The cathedral roof is a triangular roof with a four-tiered roof of Lanna style covered with unglazed clay tiles and decorated with Thai and Lanna style such as swan tail(Thai:หางหงส์), balalee(Thai:บราลี), tiered(Thai:ฉัตร), and There were three large doors on east and west. The side is a sliding door. The Cathedral size is width 20.30 meters, length 44 meters and height 44 meters. Inside the Cathedral it has exhibited all fields of visual arts created by Thawan Duchanee.

Small Temple 

The Small Temple was built in 1992 designed by Thawan Duchanee and built by Baan Dam's engineers. The small temple took 1 year and a half to build and exhibit.
The inspiration of the small temple is a combination art of Lanna Thai style such as Thai Yai wood carving(Thai: ไม้แกะสลักไทยใหญ่), indigenous terracotta roof(Thai: หลังคาดินขอพื้นเมือง), tier roof(Thai: ลดชั้น), tiered(Thai:ฉัตร), balalee(Thai:บราลี), gable apex().
The Small Temple is a rectangular building along the east–west axis. It has 6 wooden pillars and has stairs on both sides on the east and west sides.
To set the landscape of a small temple leading to the cathedral.

Architecture Style 
The small temple is a one-story building raised from the ground around 1 meter based on mortar.  The building structure is all wooden with 6 wooden pillars. The small temple roof is a triangular roof with a four-tiered roof of Lanna style covered with an indigenous terracotta roof and decorated the roof with Thai and Lanna style such as swan tail(Thai:หางหงส์), balalee(Thai:บราลี), tiered(Thai:ฉัตร), and There were two doors on east and west, and the side have 2 windows. The Small Temple size is 2.34 meters, length 5.20 meters and height 9.34 meters. Inside the small temple, it has a wooden carved Buddha and the arch is a work of Thai and Burma art style.

East Pavilion 

The east pavilion was built in 1994 designed by Thawan Duchanee and built by Baan Dam's engineers. The east pavilion took 1 year to build and exhibit.
The inspiration of the east pavilion is the mansard Thai Lanna style roof.
The east pavilion is a rectangular building along the east–west axis.
For multipurpose hall such as a guest room.

Architecture Style 
The east pavilion is a one-story building based on mortar. The building structure it's all wooden with 6 wooden pillars. The east pavilion used glass instead of a wall and the roof is a triangular roof with a mansard Lanna style roof covered with indigenous terracotta roof. The east pavilion size is 3.60 meters, length 5.60 meters, and height 9.00meters. Inside of the east pavilion has one large wooden table size 3 x 2 meters, indigenous art, hill tribe indigenous instruments, etc.

Tri Phum (Triangle House) 

Tri Phum , was constructed in 1976 - 1977, formed a triangle shape on January 1, 1977. It took a total of seven years to build and restore because it was destroyed three times by a storm.
Over seven years gathering materials, items.
The building is triangular, laid along the east–west axis. There are terraces on both sides and stairs to go up and down. 2 sides are east and west, with 25 wooden pillars supporting the entire building structure and 6 pillars supporting the front and back decks.
For creating a medium-sized figure. This building is the source of all the Thawan Duchanee's paintings in museums across the world. It's also utilized as a writer's and student's apartment.

Architectural Style 
The appearance is a single-story building raised from the ground about 1.80 meters. The building structure is all wooden structure. Wooden pillars are supporting the structure of the building. The roof is triangular with pan-kled wood. The top is next to the Galae below is decorated with a swan's tail. There is a large door on two sides. It have windows on both sides top light glass The inside is divided into three parts. There are two bedrooms and one central utility room for general use.

Visiting 
Taxis, private cars, rental cars, and public buses are all options for visiting Baan Dam Museum. The entrance charge for both Thai and international tourists is 80 baht, and the museum is open everyday from 9:00 a.m. to 5:00 p.m.

Gallery

References 

Museums in Thailand
Thai contemporary art
Tourist attractions in Chiang Rai province